Augats, seyós qui credets Déu lo Payre (sometimes called the Plany de la Verge) is a Catalan poem of lamentation (planctus) in the planctus Mariae tradition, in which the Virgin Mary laments the death of her son. It was written between 1240 and 1260 and is thus one of the oldest Catalan poems, although it is comes two hundred years after the Cançó de Santa Fe. The piece is sometimes confused with the Plant de la Verge of Ramon Llull.

Structurally, Augats is divided into twelve stanzas, each composed of five monorhyming decasyllabic lines followed by tetrasyllabic single-line refrain and a final decasyllabic line without rhyme. The language of the poem is heavily influenced by the Occitan of the troubadours and the courtly love lyric.

The poem is preserved in four manuscripts. It was first brought to light by Jaime Villanueva in 1821, when he redacted it for publication from a manuscript in the archives of the church of Àger. Villanueva found it entitled Planctus Sanctae Mariae virginis. Its language (whether Occitan or Catalan) became at once an issue of debate. The first two lines of the second stanza are a direct translation of an earlier Latin lament, Qui per viam pergitis. The poem, which was perhaps performed, is the first-person lament of the Virgin Mary over the crucifixion of her son, Jesus Christ:

References

Otto, Richard (1889). "Der Planctus Mariae". Modern Language Notes, 4:4 (Apr.), pp. 105–108. 
Riquer, Martí de (1964). Història de la Literatura Catalana, vol. 1. Barcelona: Edicions Ariel. 
Sticca, Sandro (1988). The Planctus Mariae in the Dramatic Tradition of the Middle Ages. Joseph R. Berrigan, trans. London: University of Georgia Press. 
Villanueva, Jaime (1821). Viage literario á las iglesias de España. Valencia: Imprenta de Oliveres. For his transcriptions, see pp. 281–3.

External links
MS 1144: Leccionari d'Àger, Bibliografia de Textos Catalans Antics, at PhiloBiblon.

Medieval Catalan literature
Occitan literature